New York City: The Album is the debut studio album by American rapper Troy Ave. It was released on November 4, 2013, by BSB Records. The album features guest appearances from King Sevin, N.O.R.E., Prodigy, Raekwon, DJ Uneek, Pusha T and Young Lito.

Critical reception

Bruce Smith of HipHopDX praised Ave for displaying his "wittiness and overall personality" throughout the record without coming across as "formulaic" when telling different hip-hop stories, saying: "Without feeling forced, Troy Ave has created an album that is sure to give New Yorkers something to be proud of, and those outside of the five boroughs something resembling the music they most likely also loved from the NYC." Despite finding it over-long in its "drug-fueled rap" track listing and narrow in its NYC viewpoint, Brian Josephs of XXL praised Ave's "street narratives and braggadocios barks" he delivers with an assured vibe and the overall self-awareness throughout the album's "standard humanizing introspective cuts" ("Regretful" and "Mama Tears"), saying that "New York City: The Album isn't the sound of an album that's all that interested in the progressive rap conversation or even finding its own place in that conversation. It's an insular affair that recalls the cold ruthlessness and chest-beating confidence required to take over a turn of the millennium Brooklyn.

Track listing

References

2013 debut albums
Troy Ave albums
Albums produced by AraabMuzik
Albums produced by Scram Jones
Albums produced by Harry Fraud